Niko Aleks Peleshi (born 11 November 1970 in Korçë) is an Albanian politician who currently is serving as the  Minister of Defence  since 31 December 2020. He previously has served as the Deputy Prime Minister of Albania in September 2013. He was Prefect of Korçë from 2004 to 2005 and Mayor of Korçë from 2007 to 2012. Since 2012 he has been a member of the Presidency of the Socialist Party. Since 2019 he's been an official deputy.

Biography 
He is married to Amarda Peleshi and has three children.

He graduated with honours in Electronic Engineering from the Polytechnic University of Tirana and was awarded the title of Electronic Engineer. In 1989 he completed secondary education with honours in Korçë, at Raqi Qirinxhi High School.

Peleshi worked for several years in the private business sector in the city of Korçë and was head of the Korçë Chamber of Commerce and Industry from 2001 to 2004.

His political career started in October 2004 when he was appointed Prefect of Korça Region. He stayed in office for one year. In 2005 he was elected Chair of Korçë Socialist Party Branch. In the local elections of February 2007 he was elected Mayor of Korçë, to be reconfirmed in this office in the 2011 local elections. He is a member of the Socialist Party Chairmanship since 2012.

In 2013 he became a full of the Monitoring Committee of the Congress of Local and Regional Authorities of the Council of Europe.

He has good knowledge of English and German.

References

External links 
 Personal website
 Official Website of the Albanian Council of Ministers

1970 births
Living people
Agriculture ministers of Albania
Defence ministers of Albania
Mayors of Korçë
People from Korçë
Socialist Party of Albania politicians
Deputy Prime Ministers of Albania